Domingos Carrilho Demétrio (29 June 1922 – 28 July 1989), commonly known as Patalino, was a Portuguese footballer who played as a forward.

Club career
Patalino was born in Elvas, Portalegre District. He spent nine seasons of his 23-year senior career in the Primeira Liga, representing Sport Lisboa e Elvas, O Elvas C.A.D. and Lusitano G.C. and amassing totals of 187 matches and 124 goals.

International career
Patalino earned three caps for the Portugal national team over slightly less than two years, scoring in his debut in a 3–2 win against Wales on 15 May 1949. All of his appearances were in friendlies.

External links

1922 births
1989 deaths
Portuguese footballers
Association football forwards
Primeira Liga players
Liga Portugal 2 players
O Elvas C.A.D. players
Lusitano G.C. players
Portugal international footballers
People from Elvas
Sportspeople from Portalegre District